Salka Valka is a 1954 Swedish drama film directed by Arne Mattsson and starring Gunnel Broström, Folke Sundquist and Margaretha Krook. It was shot at the Stockholm studios of Nordisk Tonefilm and on location in Iceland. The film's sets were designed by the art director Bibi Lindström. It is based on the novel of the same title by the Icelandic writer Halldór Laxness.

Cast
 Gunnel Broström as 	Salka Valka
 Folke Sundquist as 	Arnaldur Björnsson
 Margaretha Krook as 	Sigurlina Jonsdottir 
 Erik Strandmark as Steinthor Steinsson
 Birgitta Pettersson as 	Young Salka Valka
 Nils Hallberg as 	Angantyr Bogesen
 Rune Carlsten as 	Johan Bogesen
 Sigge Fürst as 	Salvation Army Captain
 Marianne Löfgren as 	Tordis
 Elsa Prawitz as 	American Tourist
 John Norrman as 	Eyjolfur
 Hedvig Lindby as 	Steinunn
 Lárus Pállsson as 	Beinten 
 Ingemar Holde as 	Gudmundur Jonsson
 Åke Lindström as 	Laborer
 Erik Hell as 	Customs Inspector
 Stig Johanson as Teacher
 John Melin as 	Katrinus
 Lars 'Lasse' Andersson as 	Arnaldur as child
 Ann-Marie Adamsson as 	Guja
 Birger Åsander as Skipper

References

Bibliography 
 Iverson, Gunnar, Widding Soderbergh, Astrid & Soila, Tytti. Nordic National Cinemas. Routledge, 2005.

External links 
 

1954 films
Swedish drama films
1954 drama films
1950s Swedish-language films
Films directed by Arne Mattsson
Films based on Icelandic novels
Films set in Iceland
Films shot in Iceland
1950s Swedish films